Corrie may refer to:

Arts and entertainment
 nickname of Coronation Street, a long-running British television soap opera
 Corrie!, a play written to celebrate the 50th Anniversary of Coronation Street in 2010
 The Corries, a Scottish folk group

People
 Corrie (surname), a surname (including a list of persons with the name)
 Corrie family, a Scottish family

 Corrie (given name), a given name (including a list of persons with the name)

Other uses
 Corrie or cirque, a terrain feature created by glaciation in high mountains
 Corrie, Arran, a village on the Isle of Arran, Scotland
 A frequently used abbreviation of Corriechatachan, near Broadford on the Isle of Skye (the tack of a cadet branch of the Clan Mackinnon)

See also
 Corrie Spout, a Scottish waterfall
 MV Rachel Corrie, a ship named after Rachel Corrie
 Corey (disambiguation)
 Corry (disambiguation)
 Cory (disambiguation)